Sara Christina Wedlund (27 December 1975 – 11 June 2021) was a Swedish long-distance and cross country runner, scoring successes in the mid 1990s as one of the most successful Swedish female runners at the time, participating at the 1995 World Championships in Gothenburg, Sweden and the 1996 Summer Olympics in Atlanta, Georgia, United States. She was awarded the Victoria Award in 1996.

She died on 11 June 2021, at the age of 45.

References

External links

1975 births
2021 deaths
Swedish female long-distance runners
Olympic athletes of Sweden
Athletes (track and field) at the 1996 Summer Olympics
World Athletics Championships athletes for Sweden
Athletes from Stockholm
European Cross Country Championships winners